Predrag Jović (born 29 May 1987) is a Serbian football defender who plays for FK Radnički Obrenovac.

Career
Ahead of the 2019/20 season, Jović returned to FK Radnički Obrenovac.

References

External links
 
 Predrag Jović stats at utakmica.rs
 Predrag Jović stats at footballdatabase.eu

1987 births
Living people
Footballers from Belgrade
Association football defenders
Serbian footballers
FK Radnički Obrenovac players
FK Banat Zrenjanin players
FK Inđija players
FK Radnički 1923 players
FK Kolubara players
FK Proleter Novi Sad players
OFK Grbalj players
Montenegrin First League players
Serbian First League players
Serbian SuperLiga players
Serbian expatriate footballers
Serbian expatriate sportspeople in Malta
Expatriate footballers in Malta
Serbian expatriate sportspeople in Montenegro
Expatriate footballers in Montenegro
Birkirkara F.C. players